The Science of Sleep (French: La Science des rêves, literally The Science of Dreams) is a 2006 Franco–Italian surrealistic science fantasy comedy film written and directed by Michel Gondry. Starring Gael García Bernal, Charlotte Gainsbourg, Miou-Miou and Alain Chabat, the film stems from a bedtime story written by Sam Mounier, then 10 years old.

Plot
Stéphane Miroux (Gael García Bernal), is a shy young man whose vivid dreams often interfere with his waking life. After the death of his divorced father in Mexico, Stéphane moves to Paris to live closer to his mother Christine. He moves into his childhood home and starts a new job his mother has found for him in a calendar printing company. Stéphane shows his new colleagues his drawings, a collection of twelve illustrations depicting unique disasters, he calls his collection "disasterology". But nobody at his new job appreciates his talents, the job is for nothing more than typesetting work, leaving Stéphane frustrated, as revealed in his dreams.

While leaving his apartment to go to work one day the new neighbour Stéphanie (Charlotte Gainsbourg) invites Stéphane into her apartment, Stéphane soon realizes that Stéphanie is creative and artistic. They plan to do a project together, a short animated film based around a boat Stéphanie was making.

As the story begins to unfold, surrealistic and naturalistic elements begin to overlap within Stéphane's reality, and the viewer is often uncertain of which portions constitute reality and which are dreams. One dream sequence in which Stéphane dreams his hands become absurdly giant, was inspired by a recurring nightmare director Michel Gondry had as a child.[5] As the line between dream and reality gradually becomes more blurred, Stéphane becomes enamoured with Stéphanie, and he shares his inventions with her, such as the ‘one-second time machine’. Stéphane's dreams begin to encroach on his waking life, making him unsure of reality and whether Stéphanie's feelings for him are real.

Stéphanie's toy horse is named Golden The Pony Boy, a reference to ‘The Outsiders’, the meaning poignantly hinting at Stèphane's regression and childlike behaviour around Stéphanie, which could stem from the loss of his father. Stèphane implants a mechanism inside Golden the Pony Boy that will make it gallop, he later receives a call from Stéphanie thanking him, she reveals the pony was named after Stéphane.

To Stéphane's surprise, the calendar manufacturer accepts his "Disasterology" idea and the company has a party in his honor, but he begins drinking excessively after he witnesses Stéphanie dancing with another man. The next day, Stéphane and Stéphanie have a confrontation in their hallway when Stéphane announces that he doesn't want to be Stéphanie's friend any longer.
Stéphanie offers that they discuss their issues on a date, but on his way there Stéphane has a vision that she isn't there, he runs to her apartment and bangs on her door when in actuality, she is waiting for him at the café. Stéphanie returns home, while Stéphane decides to move back to Mexico.
Before leaving, Stéphane's mother insists that he says a formal goodbye to his next-door neighbor, Stéphanie. In his attempt to do so, he becomes crass, making offensive jokes. As his antagonistic behaviour pushes her, Stéphanie asks Stéphane to leave but he climbs into her bed, noticing two items on her bedside: his one-second time machine, and the finished boat they planned to use in their animated film. The film closes with Stéphane and Stéphanie riding Golden the Pony Boy across a field before sailing off into the sea in her boat.

Cast
 Gael García Bernal as Stéphane Miroux, a shy and creative young man who moves to Paris to accompany his mother. His mother gets him a job at a calendar printing company in France. He becomes interested in his next door neighbor, Stéphanie, who is also a creative and artistic individual like himself. 
 Charlotte Gainsbourg as Stéphanie, Stéphane's next door neighbor. She's an artist disinterested in playing romantic games, reserved yet taken with Stéphane. Seems aloof but caring, which keeps the viewer guessing about her feelings. 
Works at an art supply store with her friend, Zoe. 
 Miou-Miou as Christine Miroux, the mother of Stéphane Miroux. She is the landlord of Stéphane's neighbor, Stéphanie. She is also a teacher and has a boyfriend. 
 Alain Chabat as Guy, Stéphane's sex obsessed co-worker, who often gives Stéphane advice and covers for him when he misses work.  
 Emma de Caunes as Zoé, Stéphanie's work friend who Stéphane is initially attracted to. 
 Sacha Bourdo as Serge, Stéphane's co-worker at the calendar printing company.
 Aurélia Petit as Martine, Stéphane's co-worker at the calendar printing company. 
 Pierre Vaneck as Monsieur Pouchet Stéphane's boss

Production
Information 
 The film was written and directed by Michel Gondry, and this film marked Gondry's third feature film. 
 Produced by Georges Bermann, Michel Gondry, and Frédéric Junqua. 
 Cinematography by Jean-Louis Bompoint, who is also known for doing cinematography for The Thorn in the Heart (2009) and New York, I Love You (2008). 
 Composed by Jean-Michel Bernard 
 Budget: $6,000,000 
 Aspect Ratio: 1.85 : 1
 Negative Format: 35 mm (Fuji Eterna 500T 8573)
 Film Length: 2,925 m (Portugal, 35 mm)
 Shot on Spherical Lens 
 Printed Film Format: 35mm

Locations

The Science of Sleep was shot in 4 primary locations, all in France. 
 Chérence, Val-d'Oise, France
 Forges, Orne, France
 Paris 18, Paris, France
 Paris, France

Reception
The Science of Sleep received generally favorable reviews. It holds a 71% approval rating on review aggregator Rotten Tomatoes. On Metacritic it has a score of 70 out of 100.

Box Office

The Science of Sleep was released on September 22, 2006, and remained in theaters until December 21, 2006. The film was distributed by Warner Independent Pictures. Domestically, in North America, the film grossed around US$4.6 million. The film did relatively better internationally, where it grossed US$10.4 million. Worldwide, The Science of Sleep grossed roughly 15.2 M USD.

Critical response

In a New York Times article by A.O. Scott, an American journalist and cultural critic, describes the film as "profoundly idiosyncratic" and "so confident in its oddity" that any attempt to describe and explain the film would be misleading. He later states, "What I'm trying to say is that "The Science of Sleep," for all its blithe disregard of the laws of physics, film grammar and narrative coherence, strikes me as perfectly realistic, as authentic a slice of life as I've encountered on screen in quite some time." Scott argues that the film's loose connection of events and misleading narrative are appropriate for its themes: "Plot summary, therefore, is both irrelevant and impossible. Which is not to say that the movie lacks a story, only that, like a dream, the narrative moves sideways as well as forward, revising and contradicting itself as it goes along. Mr. Gondry, who would rather invent than explain, makes a plausible case that a love story (which is what "The Science of Sleep" is) cannot really be told any other way. Love is too bound up with memories, fantasies, projections and misperceptions to conform to a conventional, linear structure."

Many other critics have stated that the film's plot is hard to understand, but Michel Gondry's grasp of emotions and visuals is what makes the story unique and profound.

Awards
 2008 BBC Four World Cinema Awards (Nominated), BBC Four World Cinema Award
 2008 Gopo Awards, Romania. (Nominated), Gopos Award Best European Film
 2007 Cannes Film Festival (Won), UCMF Film Music Award
 2007 Chlotrudis Awards (Nominated), Chlotrudis Award Best Supporting Actress
 2007 Golden Trailer Awards (Won), Golden Trailer Best Independent
 2007 Italian Online Movie Awards (IOMA)(Won), IOMA Best Special Effects (Migliori effetti speciali)
 2007 Paris Cinema (Won), Audience Award Jean-Michel Bernard
 2007 Russian National Movie Awards (Nominated), Georges Award Best Independent Movie
 2007 World Soundtrack Awards (Nominated), World Soundtrack Award Discovery of the Year Jean-Michel Bernard
 2006 European Film Awards (Won), European Film Award Best Artistic Contribution Stéphane Rozenbaum, Pierre Pell For the production design.
 2006 Sitges - Catalonian International Film Festival (Won), Audience Award Michel Gondry (Nominated), Best Film Michel Gondry 
 2006 St. Louis Film Critics Association, US (Nominated), SLFCA Award Most Original, Innovative or Creative Film

Soundtrack

The score to The Science of Sleep was composed by Jean-Michel Bernard. Jean-Michel Bernard is a French pianist, composer, educator, orchestrator, and music producer. He is also well known for regularly writing, performing, and scoring film soundtracks.
The song "Instinct Blues" by The White Stripes is used in the film but was not included on the soundtrack release. The song "If You Rescue Me", played by a band of people dressed as cats in a dream sequence, has the melody of the song "After Hours" by the Velvet Underground but with different lyrics.

Influences
Jungian Psychology

As the film The Science of Sleep constantly jumps back and forth from Stéphane's reality, dream, consciousness, and subconsciousness, the film has taken much influences from Psychology,  Jungian Psychology specifically, or also known as Analytical Psychology. The name was given by a Swiss psychiatrist, Carl Jung, who wanted to distinguish his studies from Freud's psychoanalytic theories.

The use of psychological archetypes was advanced by Jung in 1919. In Jung's psychological framework, archetypes are innate, universal prototypes for ideas and may be used to interpret observations. A group of memories and interpretations associated with an archetype is a complex, e.g. a mother complex associated with the mother archetype. Jung treated the archetypes as psychological organs, analogous to physical ones in that both are morphological givens that arose through evolution.

See also
 Dream
 Lucid dreaming
 Dream argument
 False awakening
 Hallucinations in the sane

References

External links

 
 
 
 
 
 Official trailer
 Official LiveJournal Community

2006 films
2000s fantasy comedy-drama films
French fantasy comedy-drama films
Italian fantasy comedy-drama films
2000s French-language films
2000s Spanish-language films
Films directed by Michel Gondry
2000s romantic fantasy films
Science fantasy films
Films using stop-motion animation
Warner Independent Pictures films
Partizan films
France 3 Cinéma films
Canal+ films
Films about dreams
English-language French films
French romantic fantasy films
2006 comedy films
2006 drama films
Films shot in Val-d'Oise
2000s French films